Mamadou Lamine Danfa (born 6 March 2001) is a Senegalese professional football midfielder who plays for KF Shkupi.

Club career
Danfa started playing football at his homeland and is a product of the Casa Sports youth sportive system.

In March 2020 he signed contract with the Ukrainian Premier League club Kolos Kovalivka. 
Danfa made his debut in the Ukrainian Premier League for FC Kolos as the second half-time substituted player in the losing home match against FC Shakhtar Donetsk on 14 June 2020.

International career
He was involved in the Senegal national under-20 football team, in which in 2019 he became a finalist of the Africa U-20 Cup of Nations. This result allowed the team to qualify for the 2019 FIFA U-20 World Cup in Poland, where he also participated, reaching the quarterfinals with the team.

Danfa made his debut for the Senegal national football team on 3 August 2019 in the winning (3:0) qualification match of the African Nations Championship against the Liberia national football team.

External links

References

2001 births
Living people
Senegalese footballers
Senegalese expatriate footballers
Senegal international footballers
Senegal youth international footballers
Association football midfielders
Casa Sports players
FC Kolos Kovalivka players
FK Shkupi players
Expatriate footballers in Ukraine
Senegalese expatriate sportspeople in Ukraine
Expatriate footballers in North Macedonia
Senegalese expatriate sportspeople in North Macedonia
Ukrainian Premier League players
Macedonian First Football League players